Anna Casagrande (born 26 July 1958) is an Italian equestrian.

Biography
Anna Casagrande won a team silver medal in eventing at the 1980 Summer Olympics in Moscow.

Olympic results

See also
Italy at the 1980 Summer Olympics

References

External links
 
 
 

1958 births
Living people
Italian female equestrians
Italian event riders
Olympic equestrians of Italy
Olympic silver medalists for Italy
Olympic medalists in equestrian
Equestrians at the 1980 Summer Olympics
Medalists at the 1980 Summer Olympics